SLC13A5 citrate transporter disorder is a rare neurological disease, also known as SLC13A5 epilepsy and by other names. It is a spectrum disorder, discovered in 2014. It is one of the many subtypes of Ohtahara syndrome (early infantile epileptic encephalopathy or EIEE) that have been linked to metabolic causes.

Genetic basis
Mutation in the SLC13A5 gene can cause neonatal seizures in the first few days of life. This condition is known as early infantile epileptic encephalopathy 25. The protein encoded by the gene belongs to a solute carrier family, numbered as 13. It was discovered in 2002 that it binds preferentially to and transports citrate anions. It is known as Na+-coupled citrate transporter (NaCT), and is also referred to by the gene name SLC13A5.

Citrate deficiency
The disorder is caused by loss of function mutations in the SLC13A5 gene, with impact on citrate transport into cells. Patients typically suffer seizures in the first week of life, and develop a form of drug-resistant epilepsy.

Diagnosis
SLC13A5 disorder is an autosomal recessive disease, and its genetic diagnosis can be carried out by exome sequencing. The cause is biallelic loss of function, or in other words the disorder occurs when each of the two copies of the gene in the patient is mutated. For practical reasons sequencing of an epilepsy-related panel of genes may replace analysis of the whole exome.

Treatment
Results on ketogenic diet and drug treatment with triheptanoin are unclear. In 2021 Taysha Gene Therapies announced recognition for their TSHA-105 gene therapy as an orphan drug, by the FDA and European Commission.

Notes

Rare diseases
Neurological disorders
Epilepsy types